The following telephone numbers in Chile are geographic area codes for all national and international calls terminating in Chile.

Geographic area codes
No geographic area codes exist in Chile; all calls within Chile are considered local calls. All numbers contain 9 digits and there is no difference among land-line, mobile and VoIP

Transition to area code deprecation
In 2012 and 2013, land lines were renumbered, with an additional digit 2 prepended.   The change was rolled out gradually by area code; first in Santiago (Region Metropolitana) and Arica in late 2012, then throughout all remaining regions between March and July 2013.

During that transitional period, when calling a landline, area code and an extra 2 were added at the beginning of the number, or between the area code and number.  E.g. a formerly seven digit Santiago number (02) XXX XXXX became 22X XXX XXX, and a formerly six digit Punta Arenas number (061) YYY YYY became 612 YYY YYY.

The process was completed in September 2016.

Total number portability 
Total number portability exists in Chile, so users can freely move from one service provider to another without losing their number, regardless of connection technology, whether land-line, mobile or VoIP. Therefore, a number beginning with "8" or "9" no longer denotes that it is a mobile phone number.

Special services
There is a group of special numbers for public services, and they are in the format 1XY. The most important ones are:

 130 Forest fires (Incendios forestales)
 131 Ambulance (SAMU)
 132 Firefighters (Bomberos)
 133 Police Emergency (Emergencias Policiales)
 134 Investigaciones
 135 Drug usage prevention hot line (Fono drogas)
 136 Mountain Rescue (Cuerpo de Socorro Andino)
 137 Sea Rescue (Rescate Marítimo de la Armada)
 139 Police Information  (Informaciones Policiales)
 147 Child abuse prevention (Fono niños)
 149 Family Violence (Fono familia)

Long-distance carriers
In Chile it is necessary to choose the carrier for international long-distance calls every time and therefore to obtain the best rate for any destination. Long-distance carriers have a prefix that must be dialed when calling long distance:
XXX + 0 + country code + area + phone

The current carrier codes are:
 110 Claro Chile
 111 VTR Chile
 112 Convergia Chile
 113 Transam
 114 E-Newcarrier.com Chile
 115 Empresa de Telecomunicaciones Netonone
 116 Heilsberg
 119 Concert Chile
 120 Globus
 121 Telefónica del Sur
 122 Gtd Manquehue
 123 Entel Larga Distancia
 124 GSP Chile
 125 Equant Chile
 127 Sur Telecomunicaciones
 151 Astro
 153 STEL-CHILE S.A
 154 MiCarrier Telecomunicaciones
 155 Claro Chile
 158 Fibersat

 169 Carrier 169
 170 Impsat Chile
 170 Global Crossing
 171 Claro Chile
 176 NetChile
 177 Empresa de Transporte de Señales
 180 Hogar de Cristo
 181 Movistar
 188 Telefónica CTC

Mobile phone numbers
Mobile phone numbers do not have a specific starting digit.

See also
Chilean Carrier Selection Code

References

 
Chile
Telecommunications in Chile
Telephone numbers